The Sheikhdom of al-Hawra (Arabic: Mashyakhat al-Hawra) was a state of the Protectorate of South Arabia which existed from the 19th century to 1967. It became a British protectorate in 1888.

History

Early history 
The Sheikhdom of al-Hawra was established in the 19th century. The first known Sheikh of al-Hawra was Abd Allah ibn Muhammad Ba Shahid, who ruled from circa 1858 to 1895.

Theodore Bent's visit 
Between 1893 and 1897, Theodore Bent, and his wife, Mabel Bent, undertook several expeditions into Southern Arabia. At one point, they visited the Sheikhdom of al-Hawra, where they described a large castle, belonging to the ruling Al Kaiti family, dominating a humble village. The castle, built out of sun-dried bricks, was seven stories high and covered roughly an acre (4 km2) of land, and prominently featured battlements, towers, and machicolations. Theodore and Mabel were welcomed by the Sultan, who requested a gift, which was given in the form of 20 Indian Rupees.

British protectorate 
Starting in 1888, the British Empire paid an annual stipend to al-Hawra, and a Protectorate Treaty was concluded with them in that year. In May 1895 Shaikh Abdulla bin Muhammad ba Shahid, the representative Shaikh, died. He was succeeded by Shaikh Said bin Abdulla ba Shahid who abdicated in February 1896, being succeeded by his brother, Shaikh Ahmed bin Abdulla. The latter died in March 1900, and was succeeded by Shaikh Saleh bin Awadh.

A revised Protectorate Treaty was concluded with the latter in April 1902, when his stipend was increased from 50 to 180 dollars.

On the 6th October 1917 Shaikh Salih bin Awadh died. He was succeeded by his son, Awadh bin Salih.

End of the Sheikhdom
In , al-Hawra was incorporated into Wahidi Balhaf.

Rulers 
The rulers of al-Hawra bore the title Shaykh al-Hawra.

List of Sheiks 

 `Abd Allah ibn Muhammad Ba Shahid, 1858? – 6 May 1895
 Sa`if ibn `Abd Allah Ba Shahid, 1895 – February 1896
 Ahmad ibn `Abd Allah Ba Shahid, February 1896 – 1 March 1900
 Salih ibn `Awad Ba Shahid, March 1900 – 6 October 1917 (Interrupted in May 1904)
 Awad ibn Salih Ba Shahid, October 1917 – 1951

Graphical timeline

Demographics 
In 1946, the Sheikhdom of al-Hawra had a population of 300.

Geography 
al-Hawra is a seaport about 12 miles from Irqa. A report in 1946 described al-Hawra as a "small fishing village".

Notes

References 

States and territories established in the 19th century
States and territories disestablished in 1951
History of Yemen
Former monarchies of South Asia
Former British protectorates